The Shoshone pupfish (Cyprinodon nevadensis shoshone) is a subspecies  of Cyprinodon nevadensis from California in the United States. It is characterized by large scales and a "slab-sided," narrow, slender body, with the arch of the ventral contour much less pronounced than the dorsal. It also has fewer pelvic fin rays and scales than the other subspecies of C. nevadensis.

Distribution
Its entire range is at the Shoshone Springs. This is a small spring which feeds into the upper Amargosa River in the town of Shoshone, Inyo County, California.  The town and the springs are both found within the Amargosa Valley and in the region referred to as the Amargosa Desert. The springs are 21 km north of Tecopa, California. It was considered extinct by the late 1960s, but was rediscovered in 1986 at the spring's outflow. It was rediscovery by F. R. Taylor, R. R. Miller (the original describer), J. W. Pedretti, and J. E. Deacon. This was documented in "Rediscovery of the Shoshone Pupfish Cyprinodon nevadensis shoshone (Cyprinodontidae), at Shoshone Springs, Inyo County, California". published in Bull. Southern California Acad. Sci. 87(2), 1988, pp 67–73.  The rediscovery date was 31 July 1986 in which caudal ray count differed from the original description. Although rediscovered, this pupfish does not enjoy Endangered Species Status and its present survival is unverified by redocumentation.

Description
Pupfish, such as the Shoshone pupfish, exhibit many adaptions for life in extreme thermal and osmotic environments. Pupfish growth is rapid and sexual maturity is reached within four to six weeks. This short generation time enables pupfish to maintain small but viable populations. Among the subspecies, however, there are minor differences in generation times, with pupfish in habitats with widely fluctuating environmental conditions exhibiting the shortest.

Shoshone pupfish like other C. nevadensis subspecies had wide temperature tolerances (2 to 44 °C); however, the preferred range is 24 to 30 °C. Extreme temperatures affect egg production and viability, thus any alterations to their habitat that would result in temperature changes outside the range of their reproductive temperature optima are potentially deleterious. Eggs, however, become resistant to environmental stresses within hours of being laid.

Shoshone pupfish, like other pupfishes, feed primarily on blue-green cyanobacteria but also consume small invertebrates like chironomid larvae, ostracods, and copepods.  They forage continuously from sunrise to sunset and become inactive at night. Their guts are extremely long and convoluted, an adaptation that enables them to digest cyanobacteria.

See also
Pupfish

Other local Cyprinodons

 Death Valley pupfish, Salt Creek pupfish Cyprinodon salinus
 Shoshone Pupfish, Cyprinodon nevadensis shoshone
 Tecopa Pupfish, Cyprinodon nevadensis calidae (extinct)
Devils Hole pupfish Cyprinodon diabolis
Desert pupfish Cyprinodon macularius
Owens pupfish Cyprinodon radiosus

References

Notes

Cyprinodon
Pupfish, Shoshone
Pupfish, Shoshone
Pupfish, Shoshone
Pupfish, Shoshone
Taxa named by Robert Rush Miller
Fish described in 1948
Amargosa Desert
Desert National Wildlife Refuge Complex
Natural history of Inyo County, California
Endangered fauna of California
Fauna without expected TNC conservation status